Mascota  is a town and municipality in Jalisco, in central-western Mexico. The municipality covers an area of 1,591.63 km². The name Mascota comes from the root "Amaxacotlán", which means "place of deer and colubrids".

The municipality has smaller villages such as Tecuani and La Plata, both a couple miles away. Mascota is surrounded by roads and pine-covered mountains and is a usual stop on the road to Talpa De Allende or Puerto Vallarta.

As of 2005, the municipality had a total population of 14,045.

History 
In prehispanic times, Mascota was the head of a cacicazgo, which ruled over the populations of Talpa, El Tuito and Chacala. In 1525, the Spanish explorer Francisco Cortés de San Buenaventura arrived to Mascota, who was commanded by Hernán Cortés to conquer the provinces north of Colima, which was subsequently renamed to "Valle de Banderas". 10 years after, in 1535, a rebellion of indigenous people was held in Mascota, along with other villages nearby.

After the time of the Mexican Independence, in 1824, the Department of Mascota was created and the town of Mascota was declared Villa de Mascota. On 10 April 1885, Villa de Mascota received the title of city.

In 2015, the city of Mascota was declared a "Pueblo Mágico".

Climate

References

Municipalities of Jalisco
Pueblos Mágicos